Pre-mRNA-processing factor 40 homolog A is a protein that in humans is encoded by the PRPF40A gene.

Interactions
PRPF40A has been shown to interact with Huntingtin.

References

Further reading